Chirognathidae is an extinct family of conodonts.

Genera are Chirognathus and Erraticodon.

References

External links 

 Chirognathidae at biolib.cz (retrieved 30 April 2016)

Prioniodinida
Conodont families